Chalcophlocteis is a genus of beetles in the family Buprestidae, containing the following species:

 Chalcophlocteis dives (Peringuey, 1908)
 Chalcophlocteis hauseri Obenberger, 1931

References

Buprestidae genera